Red Lake County is a county in the Northwestern part of the U.S. state of Minnesota. As of the 2020 census, the population was 3,935, making it the third-least populous county in Minnesota. Its county seat is Red Lake Falls.

History
Red Lake County was formed on December 24, 1896 from sections of Polk County. It was named for the Red Lake River. Its designated county seat was Red Lake Falls, which had been incorporated (as a village) in 1881.

The county has two sites on the National Register of Historic Places: the courthouse and Clearwater Evangelical Lutheran Church.

Geography
The Red Lake River flows southward into the county from Pennington County. It is joined near Red Lake Falls by the Clearwater River; the combined flow (still known as the Red Lake River) flows southwestward to Huot, where it is augmented by the Black River, which drains the northwestern part of the county. The Red Lake River then flows southwestward into Polk County. The county terrain consists of low rolling hills, etched by drainages and gullies. The area is devoted to agriculture. The county terrain slopes to the west, with its highest elevation on its southeastern corner, at 1,201' (366m) ASL.

Despite its name, Red Lake County contains only one named lake: Moran Lake, near Huot.

Red Lake County is the only landlocked county in the United States (excluding those on international borders) to border exactly two other counties.

Major highways

  U.S. Highway 2
  U.S. Highway 59
  Minnesota State Highway 32
  Minnesota State Highway 92
  Minnesota State Highway 222

Adjacent counties
 Pennington County - north
 Polk County - south

Protected areas
 Moran State Wildlife Management Area
 Old Crossing & Treaty County Wayside Park

Demographics

2000 census
As of the 2000 census, there were 4,299 people, 1,727 households, and 1,131 families in the county. The population density was 9.95/mi2 (3.84/km2). There were 1,883 housing units at an average density of 4.36/mi2 (1.68/km2). The racial makeup of the county was 97.44% White, 0.19% Black or African American, 1.84% Native American, 0.07% Asian, 0.12% from other races, and 0.35% from two or more races.  0.30% of the population were Hispanic or Latino of any race. 31.9% were of Norwegian, 25.0% German, 16.7% French and 6.3% French Canadian ancestry.

There were 1,727 households, out of which 30.70% had children under the age of 18 living with them, 55.40% were married couples living together, 6.80% had a female householder with no husband present, and 34.50% were non-families. 30.50% of all households were made up of individuals, and 15.50% had someone living alone who was 65 years of age or older. The average household size was 2.39 and the average family size was 3.02.

The county population contained 25.50% under the age of 18, 7.50% from 18 to 24, 24.70% from 25 to 44, 23.20% from 45 to 64, and 19.10% who were 65 years of age or older. The median age was 40 years. For every 100 females there were 100.80 males. For every 100 females age 18 and over, there were 99.90 males.

The median income for a household in the county was $32,052, and the median income for a family was $40,275. Males had a median income of $28,494 versus $20,363 for females. The per capita income for the county was $15,372. About 8.40% of families and 10.80% of the population were below the poverty line, including 11.50% of those under age 18 and 13.10% of those age 65 or over.

2020 Census

Communities

Cities

 Brooks
 Oklee
 Plummer
 Red Lake Falls (county seat)

Unincorporated communities

 Dorothy
 Garnes
 Huot
 Perault
 Terrebonne
 Wylie

Townships

 Browns Creek Township
 Emardville Township
 Equality Township
 Garnes Township
 Gervais Township
 Lake Pleasant Township
 Lambert Township
 Louisville Township
 Poplar River Township
 Red Lake Falls Township
 River Township
 Terrebonne Township
 Wylie Township

Government and politics
Red Lake County was formerly solidly Democratic, voting for that party's presidential nominee in all elections from 1928 until 1996, although since 2000 it has generally voted Republican, with the exception of its support for Barack Obama in 2008.

Media attention
The county received mention in the media when a Washington Post reporter, Christopher Ingraham, wrote a story calling Red Lake County "the absolute worst place to live in America" in a ranking of US counties by "scenery and climate". After vigorous objections from local and state inhabitants and legislators, Ingraham subsequently visited the county and not only reversed his position but later moved there with his family and wrote a book about his experience.

See also
National Register of Historic Places listings in Red Lake County, Minnesota

Footnotes

Further reading
 Anne Healy and Sherry Kankel, A History of Red Lake County, Red Lake County, Minnesota. Red Lake Falls MN: Ray Miller, 2003.
 Christopher Ingraham, "I Called This Place 'America’s Worst Place to Live.' Then I Went There," Washington Post, September 3, 2015.
 Oklee Golden Jubilee Historical Committee, The Oklee Community Story. n.c.: Oklee Golden Jubilee Historical Committee, 1960.
 Red Lake County Historical Society, A History of Red Lake County, Red Lake County, Minnesota. n.c.: Red Lake County Historical Society, 1976.
 Jeff M Sauve and Anne Healy, Courthouse Centennial, 1910-2010. n.c.: Red Lake County Historical Society, June 2010.

External links
 Red Lake County official website, www.co.red-lake.mn.us/

 
Minnesota counties
1896 establishments in Minnesota
Populated places established in 1896